GPFC may refer to:

 Glasgow Perthshire F.C., a Scottish football club
 Golden Point Football Club, an Australian rules football club
 Grand Popo Football Club, a French electronic music group